is a women's football club who play in the WE League. Its hometown is the city of Sagamihara, Kanagawa.

History
In the 2016 season, Nojima Stella Kanagawa Sagamihara finished the first place in the 2016 L. League Division 2 and clinched the promotion to the Division 1 for the first time in the team history.

Kits

Kit suppliers and shirt sponsors

Players

Current squad

Type 2

Club staff

Honours

Domestic
Nadeshiko League Division 2
Champions (1): 2016
Empress's Cup
Runners-up (1): 2017

Season-by-season records

Transition of team name
Nojima Stella Kanagawa: 2012–2013
Nojima Stella Kanagawa Sagamihara: 2014–present

See also
Japan Football Association (JFA)
2022–23 in Japanese football
List of women's football clubs in Japan

References

External links
 Official website

Women's football clubs in Japan
2012 establishments in Japan
Sports teams in Kanagawa Prefecture
WE League clubs